The osprey (Pandion haliaetus), also called sea hawk, river hawk, and fish hawk, is a diurnal, fish-eating bird of prey with a cosmopolitan range. It is brown on the upperparts and predominantly greyish on the head and underparts.

The osprey tolerates a wide variety of habitats, nesting in any location near a body of water providing an adequate food supply. It is found on all continents except Antarctica, although in South America it occurs only as a non-breeding migrant.

As its other common names suggest, the osprey's diet consists almost exclusively of fish. It possesses specialised physical characteristics and unique behaviour in hunting its prey. Its unique characteristics classify it in its own taxonomic genus, Pandion, and family, Pandionidae.

Taxonomy
The osprey was described by Carl Linnaeus under the name Falco haliaeetus in his landmark 1758 10th edition of Systema Naturae. The genus, Pandion, is the sole member of the family Pandionidae, and used to contain only one species, the osprey (P. haliaetus). The genus Pandion was described by the French zoologist Marie Jules César Savigny in 1809. It has always presented something of a riddle to taxonomists, but here it is treated as the sole living member of the family Pandionidae, and the family listed in its traditional place as part of the order Accipitriformes.

Other schemes place it alongside the hawks and eagles in the family Accipitridae. The Sibley-Ahlquist taxonomy has placed it together with the other diurnal raptors in a greatly enlarged Ciconiiformes, but this results in an unnatural paraphyletic classification.

The osprey is unusual in that it is a single living species that occurs nearly worldwide. Even the few subspecies are not unequivocally separable. There are four generally recognised subspecies, although differences are small, and ITIS lists only the first three.
 Pandion haliaetus haliaetus – (Linnaeus, 1758): the nominate subspecies, occurring in the Palearctic realm.
 P. haliaetus carolinensis – (Gmelin, 1788): mainland Americas. This form is larger, darker bodied and has a paler breast than the type of the first description.
 P. haliaetus ridgwayi – Maynard, 1887: Caribbean islands. This form has a very pale head and breast compared with nominate haliaetus, with only a weak eye mask. It is non-migratory. Its scientific name commemorates American ornithologist Robert Ridgway.
 P. haliaetus cristatus – (Vieillot, 1816): coastline and some large rivers of Australia and Tasmania. The smallest and most distinctive subspecies, also non-migratory. Some authorities have assigned it full species status as Pandion cristatus, known as the eastern osprey.

Fossil record
To date there have been two extinct species named from the fossil record. Pandion homalopteron was named by Stuart L. Warter in 1976 from fossils of Middle Miocene, Barstovian age, found in marine deposits in the southern part of California. The second named species Pandion lovensis, was described in 1985 by Jonathan J. Becker from fossils found in Florida and dating to the latest Clarendonian and possibly representing a separate lineage from that of P. homalopteron and P. haliaetus. A number of claw fossils have been recovered from Pliocene and Pleistocene sediments in Florida and South Carolina.

The oldest recognized family Pandionidae fossils have been recovered from the Oligocene age Jebel Qatrani Formation, of Faiyum, Egypt. However they are not complete enough to assign to a specific genus. Another Pandionidae claw fossil was recovered from Early Oligocene deposits in the Mainz basin, Germany, and was described in 2006 by Gerald Mayr.

Etymology
The genus name Pandion derives from Pandíōn , the mythical Greek king of Athens and grandfather of Theseus, Pandion II. Although Pandion II was not used to name a bird of prey, Nisus, a king of Megara, was used for the genus. The species name haliaetus comes from Greek  haliáetos "sea-eagle" (also  haliaietos) from the combining form  hali- of  hals "sea" and  aetos, "eagle".

The origins of osprey are obscure; the word itself was first recorded around 1460, derived via the Anglo-French ospriet and the Medieval Latin avis prede "bird of prey," from the Latin avis praedae though the Oxford English Dictionary notes a connection with the Latin ossifraga or "bone breaker" of Pliny the Elder. However, this term referred to the bearded vulture.

Description

The osprey differs in several respects from other diurnal birds of prey. Its toes are of equal length, its tarsi are reticulate, and its talons are rounded, rather than grooved. The osprey and owls are the only raptors whose outer toe is reversible, allowing them to grasp their prey with two toes in front and two behind. This is particularly helpful when they grab slippery fish.
It is, thus, of similar size to the largest members of the Buteo or Falco genera. The subspecies are fairly close in size, with the nominate subspecies averaging , P. h. carolinensis averaging  and P. h. cristatus averaging .

The upperparts are a deep, glossy brown, while the breast is white and sometimes streaked with brown, and the underparts are pure white. The head is white with a dark mask across the eyes, reaching to the sides of the neck. The irises of the eyes are golden to brown, and the transparent nictitating membrane is pale blue. The bill is black, with a blue cere, and the feet are white with black talons. On the underside of the wings the wrists are black, which serves as a field mark.  A short tail and long, narrow wings with four long, finger-like feathers, and a shorter fifth, give it a very distinctive appearance.

The sexes appear fairly similar, but the adult male can be distinguished from the female by its slimmer body and narrower wings. The breast band of the male is also weaker than that of the female, or is non-existent, and the underwing coverts of the male are more uniformly pale. It is straightforward to determine the sex in a breeding pair, but harder with individual birds.

The juvenile osprey may be identified by buff fringes to the plumage of the upperparts, a buff tone to the underparts, and streaked feathers on the head. During spring, barring on the underwings and flight feathers is a better indicator of a young bird, due to wear on the upperparts.

In flight, the osprey has arched wings and drooping "hands", giving it a gull-like appearance. The call is a series of sharp whistles, described as cheep, cheep or yewk, yewk. If disturbed by activity near the nest, the call is a frenzied cheereek!

Distribution and habitat

The osprey is the second most widely distributed raptor species, after the peregrine falcon, and is one of only six land-birds with a cosmopolitan distribution. It is found in temperate and tropical regions of all continents, except Antarctica. In North America it breeds from Alaska and Newfoundland south to the Gulf Coast and Florida, wintering further south from the southern United States through to Argentina. It is found in summer throughout Europe north into Ireland, Scandinavia, Finland and Great Britain though not Iceland, and winters in North Africa. In Australia it is mainly sedentary and found patchily around the coastline, though it is a non-breeding visitor to eastern Victoria and Tasmania.

There is a  gap, corresponding with the coast of the Nullarbor Plain, between its westernmost breeding site in South Australia and the nearest breeding sites to the west in Western Australia. In the islands of the Pacific it is found in the Bismarck Islands, Solomon Islands and New Caledonia, and fossil remains of adults and juveniles have been found in Tonga, where it probably was wiped out by arriving humans. It is possible it may once have ranged across Vanuatu and Fiji as well. It is an uncommon to fairly common winter visitor to all parts of South Asia, and Southeast Asia from Myanmar through to Indochina and southern China, Indonesia, Malaysia and the Philippines.

The worldwide distribution of the species is unusual for land-based birds, and only recognised in five other species.

Behaviour and ecology

Diet

The osprey is piscivorous, with fish making up 99% of its diet. Even larger  northern pike (Esox lucius) has been taken in Russia. The species rarely scavenges dead or dying fish. 

Ospreys have vision that is well adapted to detecting underwater objects from the air. They catch fish by diving into a body of water, oftentimes completely submerging their entire bodies. As an osprey dives it adjusts the angle of its flight to account for the distortion of the fish's image caused by refraction. Ospreys will typically eat on a nearby perch but have also been known to carry fish for longer distances.

Occasionally, the osprey may prey on rodents, rabbits, hares, other mammals, snakes, turtles, frogs, birds, salamanders, conchs and crustaceans. Reports of ospreys feeding on carrion are rare. They have been observed eating dead white-tailed deer and Virginia opossum.

Adaptations
The osprey has several adaptations that suit its piscivorous lifestyle:
 reversible outer toes 
 sharp spicules on the underside of the toes 
 closable nostrils to keep out water during dives 
 backward-facing scales on the talons which act as barbs to help hold its catch
 dense plumage which is oily and prevents its feathers from getting waterlogged.

Reproduction

The osprey breeds near freshwater lakes and rivers, and sometimes on coastal brackish waters. Rocky outcrops just offshore are used in Rottnest Island off the coast of Western Australia, where there are 14 or so similar nesting sites of which five to seven are used in any one year. Many are renovated each season, and some have been used for 70 years. The nest is a large heap of sticks, driftwood, turf or seaweed built in forks of trees, rocky outcrops, utility poles, artificial platforms or offshore islets.

Generally, ospreys reach sexual maturity and begin breeding around the age of three to four, though in some regions with high osprey densities, such as Chesapeake Bay in the United States, they may not start breeding until five to seven years old, and there may be a shortage of suitable tall structures. If there are no nesting sites available, young ospreys may be forced to delay breeding. To ease this problem, posts are sometimes erected to provide more sites suitable for nest building. In some regions ospreys prefer transmission towers as nesting sites, e.g. in eastern Germany.

The nesting platform design developed by one organization, Citizens United to Protect the Maurice River and Its Tributaries, Inc. has become the official design of the State of New Jersey, U.S. The nesting platform plans and materials list, available online, have been utilized by people from a number of different geographical regions. Osprey-watch.org is the global site for mapping osprey nest locations and logging observations on reproductive success.

Ospreys usually mate for life. Rarely, polyandry has been recorded. The breeding season varies according to latitude; spring (September–October) in southern Australia, April to July in northern Australia and winter (June–August) in southern Queensland. In spring the pair begins a five-month period of partnership to raise their young. The female lays two to four eggs within a month, and relies on the size of the nest to conserve heat. The eggs are incubated for about 35–43 days to hatching.

The newly hatched chicks weigh only , but fledge in 8–10 weeks. A study on Kangaroo Island, South Australia, had an average time between hatching and fledging of 69 days. The same study found an average of 0.66 young fledged per year per occupied territory, and 0.92 young fledged per year per active nest. Some 22% of surviving young either remained on the island or returned at maturity to join the breeding population. When food is scarce, the first chicks to hatch are most likely to survive. The typical lifespan is 7–10 years, though rarely individuals can grow to as old as 20–25 years.

The oldest European wild osprey on record lived to be over thirty years of age. In North America, great horned owls (Bubo virginianus), golden eagles (Aquila chrysaetos), and bald eagles (Haliaeetus leucocephalus) are the only major predators of ospreys, capable of taking both nestlings and adults. However, kleptoparasitism by bald eagles, where the larger raptor steals the osprey's catch, is more common than predation. The white-tailed eagle (Haliaeetus albicilla), which is very similar to the bald eagle, may harass or prey on the osprey in Eurasia. Raccoons (Procyon lotor) can be a serious threat to nestlings or eggs if they can access the nest. Endoparasitic trematodes (Scaphanocephalus expansus and Neodiplostomum spp.) have been recorded in wild ospreys.

Migration
European breeders winter in Africa. American and Canadian breeders winter in South America, although some stay in the southernmost U.S. states such as Florida and California. Some ospreys from Florida migrate to South America. Australasian ospreys tend not to migrate.

Studies of Swedish ospreys showed that females tend to migrate to Africa earlier than males. More stopovers are made during their autumn migration. The variation of timing and duration in autumn was more variable than in spring. European birds may also winter in South Asia, as indicated by an osprey tagged in Norway being monitored in western India. In the Mediterranean, ospreys show partial migratory behaviour with some individuals remaining resident, whilst others undertake relatively short migration trips.

Mortality 
Swedish ospreys have a significantly higher mortality rate during migration seasons than during stationary periods, with more than half of the total annual mortality occurring during migration. These deaths can also be categorized into spatial patterns: Spring mortality occurs mainly in Africa, which can be traced to crossing the Sahara desert. Mortality can also occur through mishaps with human utilities, such as nesting near overhead electric cables or collisions with aircraft.

Conservation

The osprey has a large range, covering  in just Africa and the Americas, and has a large global population estimated at 460,000 individuals. Although global population trends have not been quantified, the species is not believed to approach the thresholds for the population decline criterion of the IUCN Red List (i.e., declining more than 30% in ten years or three generations), and for these reasons, the species is evaluated as Least Concern. There is evidence for regional decline in South Australia where former territories at locations in the Spencer Gulf and along the lower Murray River have been vacant for decades.

In the late 19th and early 20th centuries, the main threats to osprey populations were egg collectors and hunting of the adults along with other birds of prey, but osprey populations declined drastically in many areas in the 1950s and 1960s; this appeared to be in part due to the toxic effects of insecticides such as DDT on reproduction. The pesticide interfered with the bird's calcium metabolism which resulted in thin-shelled, easily broken or infertile eggs. Possibly because of the banning of DDT in many countries in the early 1970s, together with reduced persecution, the osprey, as well as other affected bird of prey species, have made significant recoveries. In South Australia, nesting sites on the Eyre Peninsula and Kangaroo Island are vulnerable to unmanaged coastal recreation and encroaching urban development.

Cultural depictions

Literature
 The Roman writer Pliny the Elder reported that parent ospreys made their young fly up to the sun as a test, and dispatched any that failed.
 Another odd legend regarding this fish-eating bird of prey, derived from the writings of Albertus Magnus and recorded in Holinshed's Chronicles, was that it had one webbed foot and one taloned foot.
 The osprey is mentioned in the famous Chinese folk poem "guan guan ju jiu" (關關雎鳩); "ju jiu" 雎鳩 refers to the osprey, and "guan guan" (關關) to its voice. In the poem, the osprey is considered to be an icon of fidelity and harmony between wife and husband, due to its highly monogamous habits. Some commentators have claimed that "ju jiu" in the poem is not the osprey but the mallard duck, since the osprey cannot make the sound "guan guan".
 The Irish poet William Butler Yeats used a grey wandering osprey as a representation of sorrow in The Wanderings of Oisin and Other Poems (1889).
 There was a medieval belief that fish were so mesmerised by the osprey that they turned belly-up in surrender, and this is referenced by Shakespeare in Act 4 Scene 5 of Coriolanus:
I think he'll be to Rome
As is the osprey to the fish, who takes it
By sovereignty of nature.

Religion
In Buddhism, the osprey is sometimes represented as the "King of Birds", especially in  'The Jātaka: Or, Stories of the Buddha’s Former Births' , no. 486.

Iconography

 In heraldry, the osprey is typically depicted as a white eagle, often maintaining a fish in its talons or beak, and termed a "sea-eagle". It is historically regarded as a symbol of vision and abundance; more recently it has become a symbol of positive responses to nature, and has been featured on more than 50 international postage stamps.
 In 1994, the osprey was declared the provincial bird of Nova Scotia, Canada. 
 It is also the official bird of Södermanland, Sweden.
 The cap badge of Rhodesia's Selous Scouts (1973-1980) was a stylized osprey.
 Ospreys are a common feature of First nations artwork in the Pacific Northwest, such as Kwakwakaʼwakw art. They are often used to depict the mythical  thunderbird.

Sports
The osprey is used as a brand name for various products and sports teams, such as the Ospreys (a Welsh Rugby team) and Seattle Seahawks (an American football team of the National Football League). The official mascot of athletic teams at the University of North Carolina Wilmington is named Sammy C. Hawk. The Riverhawk is the mascot for Northeastern State University in Tahlequah, Oklahoma as well as the University of Massachusetts-Lowell. The Osprey is the mascot of the University of North Florida in Jacksonville, Florida.

Other
So-called "osprey" plumes were an important item in the plume trade of the late 19th century and used in hats including those used as part of the army uniform. Despite their name, these plumes were actually obtained from egrets.

During the 2017 regular session of the Oregon Legislature, there was a short-lived controversy over the western meadowlark's status as state bird versus the osprey. The sometimes-spirited debate included state representative Rich Vial playing the meadowlark's song on his smartphone over the House microphone. A compromise was reached in SCR 18, which was passed on the last day of the session, designating the western meadowlark as the state songbird and the osprey as the state raptor.

References

Notes

External links
 
 
 
 
 UK Osprey Information Royal Society for the Protection of Birds
 
 Osprey species text in The Atlas of Southern African Birds
 Osprey – Pandion haliaetus – USGS Patuxent Bird Identification InfoCenter
 Osprey Info Animal Diversity Web
 USDA Forest Service osprey data
 Osprey Nest Monitoring Program at OspreyWatch
 Ospreys Rebound, Rely On Help From Humans   Documentary produced by Oregon Field Guide
 Hellgate Ospreys Bird Cam Montana Osprey Project, hosted by the Cornell Lab

Pandion (bird)
Falconiformes (sensu lato)
Cosmopolitan birds
Birds of the Dominican Republic
Extant Miocene first appearances
Symbols of Oregon
Provincial symbols of Nova Scotia
Taxa named by Carl Linnaeus
Birds described in 1758